Order of the Republic of Montenegro is the highest state order of Montenegro.
The order is awarded by the President of Montenegro to prominent individuals. It is awarded on a large necklace, and on a sash.

Ranks
Order of the Republic of Montenegro has two classes.

Recipients
2018 -  Boyko Borisov
2017 -  Jens Stoltenberg
2017 -  Abdullah II of Jordan

See also 
 Orders, decorations, and medals of Montenegro

References

Awards established in 2006
Orders, decorations, and medals of Montenegro
Orders of chivalry awarded to heads of state, consorts and sovereign family members